The JOLTS report or Job Openings and Labor Turnover Survey is a report from the Bureau of Labor Statistics measuring Employment, layoffs, job openings, and quits in the United States economy. The report is released monthly and usually a month after the jobs report for the same reference period. Job separations are broken down into three categories quits or voluntary resignations, layoffs or discharges, and other separations which include deaths and retirements.  Job openings and the quits rate were at an all time high in 2021 and 2022 triggering the Great Resignation.

See also
 Nonfarm payrolls
 Occupational Employment and Wage Statistics

References

 
Federal Statistical System of the United States
National statistical services
Official statistics
Statistical organizations in the United States
Unemployment in the United States